Rahouia is a town and commune in Tiaret Province in north-western Algeria.

References

Notable people
Mazouz El_hocine ((Wali de Batna))

Communes of Tiaret Province
Cities in Algeria
Algeria